The Journal de Mathématiques Pures et Appliquées is a French monthly scientific journal of mathematics, founded in 1836 by Joseph Liouville (editor: 1836–1874). The journal was originally published by Charles Louis Étienne Bachelier. After Bachelier's death in 1853, publishing passed to his son-in-law, Louis Alexandre Joseph Mallet, and the journal was marked Mallet-Bachelier. The publisher was sold to Gauthier-Villars (:fr:Gauthier-Villars) in 1863, where it remained for many decades. The journal is currently published by Elsevier. According to the 2018 Journal Citation Reports, its impact factor is 2.464. Articles are written in English or French.

References

External links 
 
 Online access
 http://sites.mathdoc.fr/JMPA/

Index of freely available volumes
Up to 1945, volumes of Journal de Mathématiques Pures et Appliquées are available online free in their entirety from Internet Archive or Bibliothèque nationale de France. Recent volumes (from 1997 onward) are made freely available on the journal's website after 48 months.

 
 
 
 
 
 
 
 
 
 
 
 
 
 
 
 
 
 
 
 
 
 
 
 
 
 
 
 
 
 
 
 
 
 
 
 
 
 
 
 
 
 
 
 
 
 
 
 
 
 
 
 
 
 
 
 
 
 
 
 
 
 
 
 
 
 
 
 
 
 
 
 
 
 
 
 
 
 
 
 
 
 
 
 
 
 
 
 
 
 
 
 
 
 
 
 
 
 
 
 
 
 
 
 
 
 
 
 
 
 
 "J. Math. Pures Appl. Ser. 9 Vol 76-103 (1997 - Jun 2015)" ScienceDirect

Mathematics journals
Publications established in 1836
Elsevier academic journals
Monthly journals
Multilingual journals